Acrossota is a monotypic genus of corals belonging to the monotypic family Acrossotidae. The only species is Acrossota amboinensis.

The species is found in Malesia.

References

Octocorallia genera
Acrossotidae
Monotypic cnidarian genera